Walter Pye may refer to:
 Walter Pye (lawyer) (1571–1635), English barrister, courtier, administrator and politician
 Walter Pye (Royalist) (1610–1659), his son, English politician and Royalist